HD 153370 is binary star in the southern constellation of Ara.

References

External links
 HR 6312
 CCDM J17018-5108
 Image HD 153370

Ara (constellation)
153370
Double stars
083321
A-type main-sequence stars
6312
Durchmusterung objects
Binary stars